Kesegofetse Mochawe (born 30 January 1995) is a Motswana footballer who plays as a defender for the Botswana women's national team.

International career
Mochawe capped for Botswana at senior level during the 2016 Africa Women Cup of Nations qualification.

See also
List of Botswana women's international footballers

References

1995 births
Living people
Botswana women's footballers
Women's association football defenders
Botswana women's international footballers
Botswana expatriate women's footballers
Expatriate women's footballers in Equatorial Guinea